Dylan Alcott defeated the defending champion David Wagner in the final, 7–5, 6–2 to win the quad singles wheelchair tennis title at the 2018 US Open.

Seeds

Draw

Final

Round robin
Standings are determined by: 1. number of wins; 2. number of matches; 3. in two-players-ties, head-to-head records; 4. in three-players-ties, percentage of sets won, or of games won; 5. steering-committee decision.

External links
 Draw

Wheelchair Quad Singles
U.S. Open, 2018 Quad Singles